Nathalie Schwarz (born 29 July 1993) is an Austrian cross-country skier. She competed at the 2014 Winter Olympics in Sochi, in 10 kilometre classical, was part of the Austrian team that placed thirteenth in the relay, and competed in the women's sprint.

Cross-country skiing results
All results are sourced from the International Ski Federation (FIS).

Olympic Games

World Cup

Season standings

References

External links

1993 births
Living people
Cross-country skiers at the 2014 Winter Olympics
Austrian female cross-country skiers
Tour de Ski skiers
Olympic cross-country skiers of Austria
21st-century Austrian women